Suresh Balaji is an Indian film producer, primarily concentrating in Malayalam and Tamil films. He is the son of producer and actor K. Balaji. He has produced many successful ventures like Billa, Vazhvey Maayam, Gandharvam, Ulladakkam, 13 B, Yaavarum Nalam, Malamaal Weekly, Phir Milenge and Billa 2.

Now he is doing films as executive producer as well as Line producer under the banner Wide Angle Creations with his business partner George Pius and the French film Dheepan which won the Palme d'Or at 68th Cannes Film Festival is a collaboration of Wide Angle Creations and French director Jacques Audiard.

Partial filmography

References

 http://www.dishant.com/producer/suresh-balaji.html -
 http://www.popcorn.oneindia.in/artist-upcoming-movies/.../suresh-balaji.html -

External links
 

Living people
Film producers from Chennai
Tamil film producers
Malayalam film producers
Year of birth missing (living people)